Krasnaya Gorka is a rural locality (a selo) in Antonovsky Selsoviet of Arkharinsky District, Amur Oblast, Russia. The population was 4 in 2018. There are 2 streets.

Geography 
Krasnaya Gorka is located 19 km northwest of Arkhara (the district's administrative centre) by road. Zhuravli is the nearest rural locality.

References 

Rural localities in Arkharinsky District